Ola Wærhaug (born 24 December 1937) is a former Norwegian biathlete. He received a silver medal at the 1968 Winter Olympics in Grenoble. He participated on the winning teams at the 1965 and at the 1967 Biathlon World Championships.

Biathlon results
All results are sourced from the International Biathlon Union.

Olympic Games
1 medal (1 silver)

*The relay was added as an event in 1968.

World Championships
2 medals (2 gold)

*During Olympic seasons competitions are only held for those events not included in the Olympic program.
**The team (time) event was removed in 1965, whilst the relay was added in 1966.

References

External links
 

1937 births
Living people
People from Skedsmo
Norwegian male biathletes
Biathletes at the 1960 Winter Olympics
Biathletes at the 1964 Winter Olympics
Biathletes at the 1968 Winter Olympics
Olympic biathletes of Norway
Medalists at the 1968 Winter Olympics
Olympic medalists in biathlon
Olympic silver medalists for Norway
Biathlon World Championships medalists
Sportspeople from Viken (county)